Quinta del Sordo, or Quinta de Goya, was an extensive estate and country house situated on a hill in the old municipality of Carabanchel on the outskirts of Madrid. The house is best known as the home of Francisco de Goya, where he painted 14 murals known as the Black Paintings. Contrary to popular belief, the estate was given its name due to the deafness of a prior owner, not Goya himself, who was deafened by illness in 1792. The house was demolished in 1909.

Goya's ownership

Francisco de Goya purchased the home on February 27, 1819 from a prior owner who was deaf. The house was initially composed of just two main rooms, each measuring 9 by 4.5 meters, and was decorated with rural motifs before Goya purchased it. Goya added a new wing for the kitchen. Goya lived in the home until his exile to Bordeaux in 1824, when he left his 17-year-old grandson Mariano in charge of the estate. During the brief periods when he would return to Madrid, Goya would stay at the home. Several reasons have been suggested for Goya's purchase of the estate. Given Goya's liberalism, it would have been somewhat important to him to distance himself from the totalitarian court of Fernando VII. After the fall of Rafael del Riego in 1823, Goya felt it necessary to leave the country and move to Bordeaux.

See also 
 Goya's birthhouse and the Museum of Engraving
 The Dog

References

External links 

 El libro de Yriarte, original, de 1867, sobre Goya. El libro clásico de Yriarte (en francés).
 Blanca Flaquer (dir.), Valeriano Bozal (asesor), «Las pinturas negras, de Francisco de Goya» [vídeo en línea], La mitad invisible, www.rtve.es, 3 de enero de 2011, y 17 de marzo de 2012. Consulta: 13-08-2012.
 Digital tour of the Quinta del Sordo

History of Madrid
Francisco Goya
Demolished buildings and structures in Madrid
Buildings and structures demolished in 1909